The 2021 Porsche Carrera Cup Great Britain was a multi-event, one-make motor racing championship held across England and Scotland. The championship featured a mix of professional motor racing teams and privately funded drivers, competing in Porsche 991 GT3 Cup cars that conformed to the technical regulations for the championship. It formed part of the extensive program of support categories built up around the BTCC centrepiece. The 2021 season was the 19th Porsche Carrera Cup Great Britain season, commencing on 12 June at Snetterton and finishing on 24 October at Brands Hatch, utilising the Grand Prix circuit, after sixteen races at eight meetings. All sixteen of the races were held in support of the 2021 British Touring Car Championship.

Teams and drivers

The following teams and drivers are currently signed to run the 2021 season.

Race Calendar

Championship standings

Drivers' championships

* Guest entry - ineligible for points

References

External links
 

Porsche Carrera Cup
Porsche Carrera Cup Great Britain seasons
Porsche Carrera Cup Great Britain
|}